Habronattus moratus is a species of jumping spider in the family Salticidae. It is found in Texas and northern Mexico.

References

Further reading
 

Salticidae
Articles created by Qbugbot
Spiders described in 1936